André Vinicius Lima Oliveira, simply known as André Vinicius (born 30 July 1991), is a Brazilian footballer who plays for Oeste as a central defender.

Career
André Vinicius began his career in the youth of Corinthians. Copa São Paulo de Juniores in 2009 and featured in the junior team of Corinthians in 2010, was named by coach Mano Menezes to integrate the core team of Corinthians.

Career statistics
(Correct )

Honours
Corinthians Paulista
Campeonato Paulista Infantil: 2006
Copa São Paulo de Juniores: 2009
Campeonato Paulista: 2013

Contract
 Contract with Corinthians until February 9, 2015.

References

External links

1991 births
Living people
Footballers from São Paulo
Brazilian footballers
Association football defenders
Campeonato Brasileiro Série B players
Liga Portugal 2 players
Sport Club Corinthians Paulista players
Paraná Clube players
Clube Atlético Bragantino players
Associação Portuguesa de Desportos players
C.F. União players
Nacional Atlético Clube (SP) players
Grêmio Osasco Audax Esporte Clube players
Clube de Regatas Brasil players
Oeste Futebol Clube players
Brazilian expatriate footballers
Brazilian expatriate sportspeople in Portugal
Expatriate footballers in Portugal